For the Kentucky meteorologist Lauren Jones, see WAVE (TV).
For the former Alabama meteorologist Lauren Jones, see WAFF (TV).

Lauren Lorraine Jones (born August 27, 1982) is an American fashion designer, model, former Barker's Beauty on The Price Is Right, former WWE Diva, actress in The Expendables, and chief creative officer of her eponymous brand product marketing company.

Early life
Jones was raised in Jackson, Mississippi, the only child of Deborah Pearsall and Jim Jones, and the granddaughter of Gloria Martinson and Mike Martinson, CEO of the Dobbs Maynard Advertising Agency. Her mother is of Scandinavian descent. Her maternal great-grandparents immigrated to the US through Ellis Island from Oslo, Norway. Jones is also the great-niece of State Representative Rita Martinson (Madison, Mississippi). She attended junior high school at St. Andrew's in Ridgeland, Mississippi, where she played Juliet in a school production of William Shakespeare's play Romeo and Juliet. At age 14, Jones, accompanied by her parents, moved from Jackson to New York. At 17, Jones was encouraged to pursue an acting and modeling career, subsequently living in London, Boston, New York City and Los Angeles. She was a high school homecoming queen and a varsity cheerleader.

In 2004 Jones earned a BBA degree in design and management from Parsons School of Design. Jones completed a study abroad program at The University of Westminster in London, England and studied her JD at Mississippi College School of Law.

Career

Actress
Jones has appeared in a number of television and movie roles. In May 2009, Jones was cast in the star-studded feature film The Expendables opposite Sylvester Stallone and Mickey Rourke as the character, Cheyenne, Mickey's love interest in the film. The film was released in theaters August 13, 2010. Jones guest appeared on Rescue Me in July 2008 and on the Nickelodeon TV series The Naked Brothers Band as Double X. Jones has also appeared on MTV2's Wonder Showzen, the soap opera  Guiding Light, in the feature film Spider-Man 3, and as a  Barker's Beauty on the CBS' game show The Price Is Right, where she appeared as a model for five weeks in April and May 2007. In late 2004 – early 2005, Jones participated in skits during the first ever SmackDown! Rookie Diva of the Year contest at No Way Out 2005. Jones starred in Fox's short lived series Anchorwoman. The show debuted August 22, 2007 on FOX.

Anchorwoman
Jones starred in the scripted/reality hybrid series Anchorwoman, premiering on the Fox Broadcasting network August 22, 2007. Jones was cast as the principal role of Anchorwoman. The role was primarily scripted and part improvisational, with a great deal of comedic undertones. Some journalists voiced outspoken criticism of the scripted 30-day broadcast-news stunt at a small Tyler, Texas television station. Jones went on to interview with Bill O'Reilly on The O'Reilly Factor. The show was canceled from the network after airing two back to back episodes. The debut scored 2.0 rating on fast nationals, and reported to have 2.7 million viewers overall.

Prior to filming Anchorwoman, Jones worked on the Baywatch workout video series, Baywatch Beach Body Workout, with Lauren Jones, which released in stores and on the Internet on December 4, 2007.

DVDs
2007: Baywatch Beach Body Workout, with Lauren Jones (Rodale Publications).

Radio
Jones has appeared on air as a guest with Ryan Seacrest on 102.7 KIIS FM, on Y101 Jackson's #1 Hit Music Station, as well as on The Out of Bounds Show on 105.9 FM ESPN Radio with Bo Bounds. Jones has further worked as an on-air host at WJQS radio station, hosting her own radio show on 1400am.

Titles

Miss Mississippi USA 2009 (First Runner Up), Miss MET-Rx 2006/2007 (Winner), Miss New York UN 2007 (Winner), Miss New York USA 2007 (Finalist), Miss New York USA 2006 (Finalist).

Filmography

Films

Television

Guest appearances

References

External links

 Official Lauren Jones Website
 
 Lauren Lorraine Shoes

1982 births
American fashion designers
Female models from Mississippi
Living people
Shoe designers
American actresses
American women fashion designers
21st-century American women